Peter Coleman is a writer and politician.

Peter Coleman may also refer to:

Peter Coleman (bishop) (1928–2001), Bishop of Crediton
Peter Tali Coleman (1919–1997), Governor of American Samoa
Peter Coleman (footballer) (born 1944), Scottish footballer
Peter T. Coleman (academic) (born 1959), social psychologist and researcher
Peter Coleman (sailor) (born 1957), American sailor

See also
Peter Colman (born 1944), biologist
Peter Coleman-Wright (born 1958), Australian baritone